Eurocup or EuroCup may refer to:

Basketball 
 EuroCup Basketball, second-tier level European professional men's basketball competition
 FIBA Europe Cup, fourth-tier level European professional men's basketball competition
 EuroCup Women, the second-caliber professional women's basketball league

Motorsport 
Eurocup Formula Renault 2.0, a Formula Renault 2.0 championship
Formula Renault V6 Eurocup, former (2003–2004) Formula Renault 3.5 championship
Eurocup Mégane Trophy, a Renault Mégane championship, started in 2005
SEAT León Eurocup, Seat León touring car racing series by SEAT Sport

See also
European Cup (disambiguation)
Euro Bowl (rugby league)
Eurobowl, European American football contest
Euro-Cup, a horse race in Germany
UEFA European Championship, association football competition involving the men's national teams of UEFA